Miloš Mitić, (December 4, 1987 – September 9, 2018) was a Paralympian athlete from Serbia. He competed in Club throw in the F51 classification, a class for quadriplegics.

At the 2016 Summer Paralympics held in Rio, he won a silver medal in athletics.

References

External links
Athletics - Milos MITIC

1987 births
2018 deaths
Paralympic athletes of Serbia
Athletes (track and field) at the 2016 Summer Paralympics
Paralympic silver medalists for Serbia
Sportspeople from Užice
Medalists at the 2016 Summer Paralympics
Track and field athletes with disabilities
Serbian people with disabilities
Sportsmen with disabilities
Club throwers
Serbian male athletes
Paralympic medalists in athletics (track and field)
20th-century Serbian people
21st-century Serbian people